Spain competed at the 2014 Winter Paralympics in Sochi, Russia, held between 7–16 March 2014.

Alpine skiing

Men

Women

Snowboarding

Para-snowboarding is making its debut at the Winter Paralympics and it will be placed under the Alpine skiing program during the 2014 Games.

Men

 Women

See also
Spain at the Paralympics
Spain at the 2014 Winter Olympics

References

Nations at the 2014 Winter Paralympics
2014
Winter Paralympics